Ballan-Miré is a commune in the Indre-et-Loire department, central France.

The commune was established 1818 by merger of the former communes of Ballan and Miré. It is located southwest of Tours.

Population

See also
Communes of the Indre-et-Loire department

References

Communes of Indre-et-Loire